In Denmark there are a wide range of higher educational institutions which offers a wide range of higher education at different educational levels such as short-length (1–2 years) educations, medium-length (3–4 years) educations and long-length educations (5–6 years).

List of educational institutions in Denmark 

Education in Denmark